Afro Beat Fest is an annual festival in Newark, New Jersey celebrating African culture including music, art, fashion, dance, crafts and cuisine.

The inaugural Afro Beat Fest was held in the recently refurbished Military Park in Downtown Newark in July 2017.  Afro Beat Fest is a reboot of an older festival that had begun in the 1980s called "Africa Newark." That incarnation ended in 2006 after it lost city support.

Mayor Ras Baraka commented that he and colleagues recalled the original festival warmly from childhood visits to the event and noted that the city worked with local organizers to revive it.

Grammy-nominated French duo Les Nubians, English-born Nigerian singer/songwriter Ayo Jay, and Ghanaian singer Bisa Kdei have all performed at the festival.

References

African-American festivals
Festivals in New Jersey
Culture of Newark, New Jersey